Swamp rattler may refer to:

 Crotalus horridus, a.k.a. the timber rattlesnake, a venomous pitviper species found in the eastern United States
 Sistrurus catenatus, a.k.a. the massasauga, a venomous pitviper species found primarily in the United States

Animal common name disambiguation pages